Olenya Guba may refer to:
Olenya Guba (rural locality), a rural locality under the administrative jurisdiction of the closed administrative-territorial formation of Alexandrovsk in Murmansk Oblast, Russia
Olenya Guba, alternative name of Olenya Bay, a naval base in Russia